Andriy Mykolayovych Livytskyi (9 April 1879 in Lyplyavo, the Russian Empire (now Cherkasy Oblast, Ukraine) – 17 January 1954) was a Ukrainian politician, diplomat, statesman, and lawyer.

He was president of the Ukrainian People's Republic in exile (1948–1954) and the Chairman of the Directory prior to reforming that office into the presidential.

Biography

Andriy Livytskyi was born on 9 April 1879 in Lyplyavo (at the time part of the Russian Empire) into an old Cossack family. He finished the Gymnasium of Pavlo Halahana in Kyiv, and later went on to study at the mathematical and juridical faculties of the St. Volodymyr Kyiv University in 1896. In 1897 and 1899 he was held in the Lukyanivska Prison in Kyiv for participation in protests. He was expelled from the university and exiled to Poltava Governorate under the secret surveillance of police for taking part in the student's strike of 1899. After obtaining his university diploma in 1903, he served in the Lubny Circuit Court, and then, since 1905, he was a barrister of the Kharkiv Court Chamber, and in 1913–1917 an elected judge of Zolotonosha uezd in the Poltava Governorate. In his studential years, he took part in the Ukrainian independence movement, heading one of the organization's bases in Kyiv.

From 1901, he belonged to the Revolutionary Ukrainian Party (RUP), heading its regional headquarters in Lubny. He was jailed once again in connections to the revolutionary activities of 1906 and after escaping was imprisoned again in 1907. Since 1917, Livytskyi was a member of the Central Rada and the Peasant Union (Ukraine). In the period of the Hetmanate (1918), he was a member of the Ukrainian National Union, in opposition to the government of Pavlo Skoropadskyi. Later during the time of the Directorate of Ukraine, he was one of the founders of the Labour Council of Ukraine - the highest governing body of Ukraine. Livytskyi also held positions as the Minister of Justice and the deputy of the Rada of National Ministers of the Ukrainian People's Republic (UPR) in 1919, as well as the head of the Ministry of Foreign Affairs in the government of Isaak Mazepa in 1919. From 14 October to 18 November 1920 he served as the Prime Minister of the Ukrainian People's Republic.

Since October 1919, he was in the Ukrainian delegation to Warsaw, where he was working on the formation of the Ukrainian-Polish agreement, which was signed in 1920. After the defeat of the Ukrainian national movement for independence, he was forced to emigrate. From 1920 to 1948, he served as the head of the government of the Ukrainian People's Republic (UPR) in exile. After Symon Petliura's assassination, he became the head of the Directorate of Ukraine and assumed the post of the Chief Otaman of the Ukrainian People's Republic Army in exile in 1926.

Since that time to the time of his death, Livytskyi served as the head of state for the government of the UPR. He lived in Warsaw under constant watch of the Polish police. After the end of World War II, Livytskyi had goals of consolidating his political activities and reorganizing the government of the UPR in exile which its first session was opened on 16 July 1948 in Augsburg, Germany. In cooperation with Isaak Mazepa, he created the Ukrainian National Rada in exile in 1948 and became the First President of the Ukrainian People's Republic in exile.

He died on 17 January 1954 in Karlsruhe, Germany, and was later buried in a cemetery in Munich and later his ashes were transferred to Ukrainian Memorial Cemetery in Bound Brook in the vicinity of New York City, United States.

Notes

References

External links 
 nbuv.gov.ua - Biography of Andrey Nikolaevich Livitsky 
 kmu.gov.ua - Another biography of Andriy Mykolaiovych Livytskyi. Available in Ukrainian
 proekt-wms.narod.ru - Biograph about Andrey Nikolaevich Livitsky 

1879 births
1954 deaths
People from Cherkasy Oblast
People from Poltava Governorate
Ukrainian people in the Russian Empire
Revolutionary Ukrainian Party politicians
Leaders of Ukraine
Taras Shevchenko National University of Kyiv alumni
Prime ministers of the Ukrainian People's Republic
Presidents of the Ukrainian People's Republic
Justice ministers of Ukraine
Foreign ministers of Ukraine
Ukrainian diplomats
Members of the Ukrainian government in exile
Ukrainian emigrants to Germany